Chazara kaufmanni is a butterfly species belonging to the family Nymphalidae. It can be found from Kopet-Dagh to Dzhungarsky Alatau.

The wingspan is 45–60 mm. The butterflies fly from July to August.

Subspecies
Chazara kaufmanni kaufmanni
Chazara kaufmanni sieversi (Christoph, 1885) (Kopet-Dagh)
Chazara kaufmanni obscurior (Staudinger, 1887) (Tian-Shan, Tarbagatai, southern Altai)
Chazara kaufmanni sartha (Staudinger, 1886) (Alaisky Mountains)

External links
 Satyrinae of the Western Palearctic - Chazara kaufmanni

Chazara
Butterflies described in 1874
Butterflies of Asia